The Peterson-Wilbanks House is a Classical Revival house in Vidalia, Georgia.  It was listed on the National Register of Historic Places in 1990.

It was designed and built by regional architect-builder Ivey P. Crutchfield (1878-1952).

It was deemed notable as "a good vernacular or small-town example of the Neoclassical style which had become prevalent or popular in American architecture at the turn of the [20th] century".

Almost directly across the street is the Leader-Rosansky House and nearby is the Crawford W. Brazell House, both also designed by Ivey P. Crutchfield and listed on the NRHP.

References

Houses on the National Register of Historic Places in Georgia (U.S. state)
Neoclassical architecture in Georgia (U.S. state)
Houses completed in 1916
Houses in Toombs County, Georgia